Norbert Haimberger (born 3 May 1969) is an Austrian judoka. He competed in the men's lightweight event at the 1992 Summer Olympics.

Awards 
 2018: Honorary member of the Judo Association Vienna

References

External links
 

1969 births
Living people
Austrian male judoka
Olympic judoka of Austria
Judoka at the 1992 Summer Olympics
Sportspeople from Vienna
20th-century Austrian people
21st-century Austrian people